The Modern Prodigal is a 1910 American short drama silent black and white film directed by D. W. Griffith. It is based on the novel by Bess Meredyth.

Cast
 Guy Hedlund as The Prodigal Son
 Clara T. Bracy as The Prodigal's Mother
 George Nichols as The Sheriff
 Kate Bruce as The Sheriff's Wife
 Jack Pickford as The Sheriff's Son
 William J. Butler as A Farmer
 Edward Dillon as Guard
 Frank Evans as Guard
 Francis J. Grandon as At Post Office
 Robert Harron as At Post Office
 Dell Henderson as At Post Office
 James Kirkwood Sr.
 W. Chrystie Miller
 Anthony O'Sullivan as At Farewell
 Alfred Paget as Guard
 Lester Predmore as One of the Boys Swimming
 Mack Sennett

References

External links
 

American silent short films
1910 short films
Silent American drama films
1910 drama films
1910 films
American black-and-white films
Films based on American novels
Films directed by D. W. Griffith
Biograph Company films
Films shot in New York (state)
1910s American films